Workman Run is a  long 1st order tributary to the Youghiogheny River in Fayette County, Pennsylvania.

Course
Workman Run rises about 0.75 miles west of the community of Mill Run, and then flows west-southwest to join the Youghiogheny River about 2.5 miles west-southwest of Mill Run.

Watershed
Workman Run drains  of area, receives about 45.7 in/year of precipitation, has a wetness index of 342.42, and is about 71% forested.

See also
List of rivers of Pennsylvania

References

 
Tributaries of the Ohio River
Rivers of Pennsylvania
Rivers of Fayette County, Pennsylvania